Stevenage Football Club (known as Stevenage Borough Football Club until 2010) is a professional association football club based in the town of Stevenage, Hertfordshire, England. The team competes in League Two, the fourth tier of the English football league system. They play their home games at Broadhall Way in Stevenage.

Founded in 1976 following the demise of the town's former club, they joined the United Counties League in 1980 and enjoyed success in the club's first year at senior status; winning the United Counties League Division One and the United Counties League Cup. Following three promotions in four seasons in the early 1990s, the club were promoted to the Conference National in 1994. Despite winning the league in the 1995–96 season, the club were denied promotion to the Football League due to insufficient ground facilities. Stevenage remained in the top tier of non-League for the following fourteen seasons, before the club earned promotion to the Football League after winning the Conference Premier in the 2009–10 season.

The promotion served as the catalyst for a rebranding of the club, dropping the word 'Borough' from its title in June 2010. In their first season in the Football League, Stevenage won promotion to League One, the third tier of English football, via the play-offs. The club achieved their highest league finish during the 2011–12 season courtesy of a sixth-placed finish in League One. The core of the team that helped guide the club to its success throughout 2009 to 2012 departed, and Stevenage were relegated back into League Two at the end of the 2013–14 season.

The club has also enjoyed success in national cup competitions, becoming the first team to win a competitive final at the new Wembley Stadium in 2007, beating Kidderminster Harriers 3–2 to lift the FA Trophy in front of a competition record crowd of 53,262. They won the competition again in 2009. The club has also produced a number of notable results in the FA Cup against high-profile opposition.

History

1976–2010
Stevenage Borough was formed in 1976 following the bankruptcy of Stevenage Athletic. Chairman Keith Berners, and "a number of like-minded volunteers" were tasked with arranging a team to play Hitchin Town Youth at Broadhall Way in November 1976, as a "curtain-raiser" for the new club. However, the Broadhall Way pitch was subsequently dug up for non-footballing purposes after Stevenage Borough Council sold the land to a local businessman, who dug a trench across the full length of the pitch to ensure no football was played. Consequently, the new club started out playing in the Chiltern Youth league on a roped-off pitch at the town's King George V playing fields, and moved up to intermediate status, joining the Wallspan Southern Combination shortly after. Stevenage Borough Council granted consent for the club to incorporate the name "Borough" in their title and to adopt the town's civic emblem as the club badge. In 1980, the council reacquired the lease for Broadhall Way and allowed the football club to become its tenant. With the council as their landlords and a refurbished stadium, Stevenage Borough took on senior status, under the management of Derek Montgomery, and joined the United Counties Football League in the same year. The club's first competitive league match was a 3–1 victory against ON Chenecks on 16 August 1980, played in front of 421 people. In their first season as a senior club, the team won the United Counties League Division One championship, scoring over a hundred goals. The club also won the United Counties League Cup during the same season.

After three successive seasons in the United Counties Premier Division, the club joined Division Two North of the Isthmian League in 1984, and the following season earned promotion to Isthmian League Division One after finishing the season as champions. Two years later, the club were relegated back to the Division Two North, having finished second bottom of the division. Brian Williams was tasked with steadying the club following the relegation; appointed as manager in July 1988. He spent two full seasons in charge, guiding Stevenage to two fourth-place finishes. Paul Fairclough was appointed as the club's manager in June 1990 and he would ultimately guide the team to four league titles in eight years. The club won promotion during the 1990–91 season, Fairclough's first season in charge, winning 34 of their 42 games. The league triumph included winning every match played at home, scoring 122 goals and amassing 107 points. The following season, Stevenage won the Isthmian League Division One title, remaining unbeaten at home for the second consecutive season, and were promoted to the Isthmian League Premier Division. A third promotion in four years followed at the end of the 1993–94 season, as Stevenage were promoted to the Football Conference after winning the Isthmian League Premier Division. Two seasons later, Stevenage won the Conference, but were denied promotion to the Football League, due to insufficient ground facilities, thus reprieving Torquay United, who had finished in last place of Division Three. During the same season, the club reached the First Round of the FA Cup for the first time, losing 2–1 to Hereford United of the Third Division at Edgar Street.

The 1996–97 season saw the club progress to the Third Round of the FA Cup for the first time after a 2–1 victory against Leyton Orient at Brisbane Road. They were drawn against Birmingham City at Broadhall Way, but ground issues saw the tie switched to St Andrew's; Birmingham won the match 2–0. The following season, the club reached the Fourth Round where they drew Premier League club Newcastle United at Broadhall Way. A temporary stand was erected behind the South Stand, allocated to the Newcastle supporters, which increased the stadium capacity to 9,000, enough to satisfy The FA. Stevenage held Newcastle to a 1–1 draw, with Giuliano Grazioli equalising after Alan Shearer had given Newcastle an early lead. Stevenage lost 2–1 in the replay at St James' Park, a goal from Alan Shearer that "appeared to not cross the line" proved the difference. Despite earning a large amount of revenue from the two respective cup runs, news emerged that the club were in financial difficulties and that the chairman, Victor Green, was going to close the club down if no buyer was found. Phil Wallace purchased the club and set about rebuilding the finances and the relationship with the local council.

During the 2001–02 season, the club reached the FA Trophy final for the first time, losing 2–0 to Yeovil Town at Villa Park. The following season, Stevenage were positioned in last place of the Conference National in January, seven points from safety. The club appointed Graham Westley as manager in January 2003. Westley guided the club to 12th position, winning eight games out of a possible 12 in the league. During the 2004–05 season, Stevenage made the play–offs after finishing fifth under the guidance of Westley. The team lost 1–0 to Carlisle United at the Britannia Stadium in the play-off final. The following year, the team finished sixth, outside of the play-off places, and Westley's contract was not renewed, ending his three-and-a-half-year spell as manager. The club appointed Mark Stimson as their new manager and the team finished in eighth position in Stimson's first season as manager. That season, the club reached the FA Trophy final again, where they came back from 2–0 down to beat Kidderminster Harriers 3–2 in front of a record FA Trophy crowd of 53,262. The victory meant that Stevenage were the first team to win a competitive final at the new Wembley Stadium.

After the FA Trophy success in 2007, as well as keeping the majority of the first-team at the club, Stevenage started the 2007–08 season by breaking a new club record when the defence kept eight consecutive clean sheets. Stimson was offered a new contract by Stevenage in October 2007, but resigned the following day and subsequently joined Football League club Gillingham. In November 2007, he was replaced by Peter Taylor. After failing to make the play-offs, Taylor resigned at the end of the season and was replaced by former manager Graham Westley. On Westley's return, Stevenage started the season slowly before going on a 27–game unbeaten run from December to March and reached the play-offs, where they lost in the semi-finals to Cambridge United, 4–3 on aggregate. During the same season, Stevenage enjoyed success in cup competitions; winning the Herts Senior Cup for the first time, beating Cheshunt 2–1 in the final, and the FA Trophy, where they beat York City 2–0 in the final.

The following season, Westley retained the majority of the squad and Stevenage were positioned in first place by New Year's Day. The squad won eight consecutive games through February and March 2010, and Stevenage were promoted to the Football League for the first time in the club's history with two games to spare. Promotion was secured thanks to a 2–0 victory at Kidderminster Harriers, as Stevenage finished the season 11 points clear at the top of the table. The club reached the final of the FA Trophy again, losing to Barrow 2–1 after extra-time. Shortly after the end of the season, chairman Phil Wallace stated that the club will start its life in the Football League as Stevenage Football Club, dropping the word 'Borough' from its name as of June 2010.

Football League (2010–present)
Stevenage's first Football League fixture was against Macclesfield Town in August 2010, ending in a 2–2 draw at Broadhall Way. Following four defeats in six games in December 2010 and January 2011, the club were in 18th position, just four points above the relegation zone. During a congested period throughout February and March 2011, Stevenage won nine games out of eleven, propelling the club up the league table and into the play-off positions. Stevenage subsequently reached the League Two play-offs, finishing in sixth place. They faced Torquay United in the 2011 Football League Two play-off Final on 28 May 2011 at Old Trafford. Stevenage won the game 1–0, securing a place in League One for the first time in the club's history, meaning the club had also earned back-to-back promotions. During the same season, Stevenage equalled their previous best performance in the FA Cup, reaching the Fourth Round of the competition before losing 2–1 to Reading. In the previous round, Stevenage were drawn against Premier League club Newcastle United, whom they had previously met, and lost over two "bitter" games, during the 1997–98 season. Stevenage subsequently beat Newcastle 3–1 at Broadhall Way, the first time the club had ever beaten first tier opposition.

In their first season in the third tier of English football, Stevenage were positioned in the League One play-off places following a fourteen-game unbeaten run that lasted for three months. In January 2012, Westley opted to leave Stevenage in order to take up the vacant managerial position at Preston North End. Former Colorado Rapids manager Gary Smith replaced Westley. A run of four wins in their last five games meant that Stevenage finished in sixth, thus taking the final play-off place, losing 1–0 on aggregate to Sheffield United in the semi-final. Stevenage also reached the Fifth Round of the FA Cup for the first time in their history during the season, losing 3–1 to Premier League club Tottenham Hotspur in a replay at White Hart Lane, after the two teams drew 0–0 at Broadhall Way.

The majority of the squad that had helped the club win back-to-back promotions into League One departed at the end of the season. New management under Smith, alongside a change in transfer policy, resulted in a complete squad overhaul. Stevenage were positioned within the top six places midway through the 2012–13 season, but a run of 14 losses from 18 matches from December 2012 meant the club were closer to the relegation places three months later. Smith was subsequently sacked in March 2013 and replaced by Westley, returning for his third spell at the club. The team finished in 18th place that season. A further squad overhaul took place ahead of the 2013–14 season and Stevenage were ultimately relegated back to League Two after finishing in last place in the League One standings that season. The team made the play-off semi-finals in their first season back in League Two, losing to Southend United.

The club opted against offering Westley a new contract and replaced him with Teddy Sheringham in May 2015, taking on his first managerial role. Sheringham was sacked in February 2016 with the club positioned in 19th. First-team coach Darren Sarll took caretaker charge for the remainder of the season and was given the role on a permanent basis after helping the club secure League Two safety. During Sarll's first full season in the charge, the club finished three points from the play-off positions. With Stevenage in 16th place during the 2017–18 season, Sarll was sacked in March 2018; Wallace stating the club "had not seen the progress expected" since making a number of signings during the January transfer window. Former player and first-team coach, Dino Maamria, replaced Sarll as manager. During the 2018–19 season, Maamria's first full season in charge, the club finished 10th, one point from the play-off places. In May 2019, Wallace announced a 12% public equity offering, through sports investment platform Tifosy, with the aim of raising funds to invest in player wages and increase the transfer budget. The offer closed on 31 July 2019, at which time the club stated a total of £300,000 worth of shares had been purchased.

The club started the 2019–20 season without a win in the opening month of the season and Maamria was subsequently sacked in September 2019. First-team coach Mark Sampson took caretaker charge, but with the club in 23rd-place after several months under his management, Graham Westley returned for a fourth spell in December 2019. Two months later, Westley resigned, and was replaced by Alex Revell, who had previously assumed the role of player-coach at the club. The club were in last place of League Two when the season was suspended due to the COVID-19 pandemic in March 2020. EFL clubs formally agreed to end the season during an EFL meeting on 9 June 2020, although "ongoing disciplinary matters" involving 23rd-placed Macclesfield Town, who had not paid their players on six separate occasions during the season, meant Stevenage might be reprieved. Stevenage were initially relegated from League Two after an independent disciplinary panel opted to deduct Macclesfield two points on 19 June, with a further four suspended, the maximum number they could deduct without relegating them, highlighting this as a key factor in the sanctions they had chosen to impose. The EFL successfully appealed against the panel's sanctions on Macclesfield, winning on 11 August; the four suspended points were applied to the 2019–20 season, meaning Stevenage finished 23rd and so remained in League Two. 

Under Revell's management, the club finished the 2020–21 season in 14th position in League Two. After three victories in the first 16 matches of the 2021–22 season, Revell left his position as first-team manager and was replaced by Paul Tisdale in November 2021. Tisdale left the club in March 2022, with Stevenage having won three of his 21 matches as manager. With the club positioned in 22nd place in League Two after a nine-match winless run, three points above the relegation places, Steve Evans was appointed as manager. The club won four of their final nine matches to avoid relegation and finish in 21st position.

Club identity

Crest
The club has had five crests since its formation in 1976. The first club crest was created in 1980 when Stevenage took on senior status, adopting the town's civic emblem as the basis of the crest. When the club were promoted to the Conference National in 1994, the crest was changed to the Stevenage Borough Council 'tick' in recognition of the help the club had received from the council in its rise through the leagues. Shortly after former chairman Victor Green took over the club, in 1996, a new crest was introduced, modelled on the town's coat of arms; incorporating the club's colours of red and white, as well as a hart – which features on both the Stevenage and Hertfordshire coat of arms. This crest was adjusted slightly in 2010 to remove the word 'Borough', in-line with the club's name change prior to playing in the Football League. The crest was modified ahead of the 2011–12 season by being placed in a shield, but reverted to the former version two years later. A new crest was created in June 2019; the hart being "brought to the forefront of the new design". The club stated that the previous crest "presented modern-day challenges due to its complex and detailed design" and therefore the new crest, circular in design, enabled the club to create a more visible identity on both a commercial and social level.

Colours
The club have always played in red and white colours. Prior to taking on senior status, the team wore red and white stripes. This changed from 1980 to 1988 when the club adopted plain red shirts and white shorts, although did wear an all red strip during the 1982–83 season. The club reverted to stripes from 1988, and the strip design has varied considerably over the years. To mark the 40th anniversary of the club during the 2016–17 season, supporters were consulted about their favourite strip and the result was a re-creation of the diagonal stripes worn from 1996 to 1998.

A table of kit suppliers and shirt sponsors appear below:

Stadium

Broadhall Way

The club plays at Broadhall Way, previously home to Stevenage Town and Stevenage Athletic. Following the bankruptcy of the town's former club, the stadium was not used for three years. The newly formed Stevenage Borough moved into Broadhall Way in 1980 as a result of the council re-purchasing the stadium. Following Stevenage's successful 1995–96 Football Conference campaign, the Hertfordshire club were denied promotion to the Football League because of insufficient ground capacity and facilities. In the early 2000s, the ground was upgraded, with a new £600,000 stand opening, including an executive suite underneath. In January 2009, Stevenage signed a seven-figure sponsorship deal with the Lamex Food Group, resulting in the renaming of Broadhall Way to The Lamex Stadium. As a result of the club securing promotion as league champions during the club's 2009–10 season, Broadhall Way hosted League football for the first time during the 2010–11 season.

The ground's pitch includes four stands – the East Terrace, the North Stand, the West Stand, and South Stand. The West Stand is all-seated and covered, and covers the length of the pitch, although it has open corners to either side of the stand. At the back of the stand there are a number of glass-fronted areas to various club offices and executive boxes. The club shop is situated next to the West Stand, opposite to the club's official car-park. Opposite to the West Stand is the East Terrace, which is a covered terrace for home supporters. The terrace has a gable with a clock sitting on its roof above the half-way line, as well as holding a television gantry on its roof.

The North Terrace was situated behind the goal at the north end of the ground and was just seven steps deep. Three-quarters of the terrace was covered, whilst one-quarter was open and without cover. The stand held a capacity of 700 people, and offered facilities for disabled fans. In January 2013, the club announced they were due to present plans to replace the existing North Terrace with a new £1.2 million 1,700 seat stand, although these did not materialise due to "numerous obstacles put in the way". In July 2017, the club asked fans to contribute towards a mini-bond investment scheme, through sports investment platform Tifosy, in an attempt to fund the remaining £500,000 needed to go towards developing the new North Stand. Five weeks after the campaign started, the £500,000 target was met after investment from over 200 fans. The North Terrace was demolished in January 2018. The 1,428 all-seater stand was officially opened in December 2019.

Opposite the North Stand is the South Stand, which is a single tiered, all-seated covered stand. The stand was built in 2001, costing £600,000. The South Stand is reserved for away supporters and can hold a capacity of 1,400. The stand also has an electronic scoreboard in the centre of the roof, which was installed in 2001, making it visible to home supporters. The scoreboard was replaced in October 2011. Behind the stand is the supporters' club. A new set of floodlights were installed before the start of the club's 2007–08 season.

Training facilities
The club opened a £5million training facility in nearby Shephalbury Park in the Autumn of 2002. In June 2011, the club announced it had secured a 42-acre former sports ground in Bragbury End – with the intention of developing the site into a new training complex. Work began on the development in the summer of 2011, and the staff began to use the complex towards the latter stages of the 2012–13 season.

Records and statistics
Stevenage's highest Football League finish was sixth place in League One during the 2011–12 season. The same season, the club recorded their best run in the FA Cup when they reached the fifth round of the competition. Stevenage's largest victory in a league match came courtesy of an 11–1 win over British Timken Athletic in the United Counties League in December 1980, whilst their heaviest defeat is an 8–0 loss to Charlton Athletic in an EFL Trophy match in October 2018.

The record for the most number of appearances for Stevenage is held by Ronnie Henry, who played 502 matches in all competitions over two spells with the club. Martin Gittings is the club's top goalscorer with 217 goals in all competitions. He is the only player to have scored over 100 goals for the club.

Players

Current squad

Out on loan
 

|-

|-
 until 30 June 2023

Notable players

Player of the Year
As voted for by Supporters Association members and season ticket holders at the club.

 1993   Martin Gittings
 1994   Stuart Beevor
 1995   Mark Smith
 1996   Barry Hayles
 1997   Paul Barrowcliff
 1998   Lee Harvey
 1999   Robin Trott
 2000   Chris Taylor
 2001   Mark Smith
 2002   Jason Goodliffe
 2003   Jason Goodliffe
 2004   Lionel Pérez
 2005   Dannie Bulman
 2006   Alan Julian
 2007   Ronnie Henry
 2008   Steve Morison
 2009   Mark Roberts
 2010   Scott Laird
 2011   Jon Ashton
 2012   Mark Roberts
 2013   James Dunne
 2014   Luke Freeman
 2015   Dean Wells
 2016   Michael Tonge
 2017   Matt Godden
 2018   Danny Newton
 2019   Scott Cuthbert
 2021   Elliott List
 2022   Luke Norris

Management

Club officials
Directors
Chairman: Phil Wallace
Directors: Stuart Dinsey, Marcus Taverner, Marc Wallace, Paul Wallace
Chief executive officer: Mike Pink

Management
Manager: Steve Evans
Assistant manager: Paul Raynor
First team coach: Alex Revell
Goalkeeping coach: Ian Pledger
First team physio: Matt Rogers
Club doctors: Kevin Zammit, Adam Maguire

Managerial history

Statistics are correct as of 1 March 2023

Honours
League Two
 Play-off winners: 2010–11
Conference National
Champions: 1995–96, 2009–10
FA Trophy
Winners: 2006–07, 2008–09
Runners-up: 2001–02, 2009–10
Herts Senior Cup
Winners: 2008–09
Isthmian League
Premier Division champions: 1993–94
Division One champions: 1991–92
Division Two North champions: 1985–86, 1990–91
United Counties League
Division One champions: 1980–81
League Cup winners: 1980–81

References

External links

 
Football clubs in England
English Football League clubs
Association football clubs established in 1976
1976 establishments in England
Isthmian League
National League (English football) clubs
Football clubs in Hertfordshire
Stevenage